George T. Bagby State Park is a  state park located in southwestern Georgia on the shore of Walter F. George Lake. The park offers a 60-room lodge, conference center, restaurant, cottages, and features the 18 hole Meadow Links Golf Course, as well as a marina and boat ramp. There is a  nature trail, and fishing and boating on Lake Walter F. George.

In 2013, George T. Bagby State Park was privatized and its management handed over to Coral Hospitality, a Florida-based hotel and resort management company. Its official name was changed to George T. Bagby State Park & Lodge.

Facilities
 
60-room lodge conference center 
Restaurant and courtesy dock 
5 cottages  
18-hole Meadow Links Golf Course and Pro Shop  
Tennis courts 
 lake and swimming beach

References

External links
Georgia State Parks

State parks of Georgia (U.S. state)
Protected areas of Clay County, Georgia